The Mesoamerican Barrier Reef System (MBRS), also popularly known as the Great Mayan Reef or Great Maya Reef, is a marine region that stretches over  along the coasts of four countries – Mexico, Belize, Guatemala, and Honduras – from Isla Contoy at the northern tip of the Yucatán Peninsula south to Belize, Guatemala and the Bay Islands of Honduras. The reef system includes various protected areas and parks including the Belize Barrier Reef, Arrecifes de Cozumel National Park, Hol Chan Marine Reserve (Belize), Sian Ka'an biosphere reserve, and the Cayos Cochinos Marine Park. Belize's coastline, including the Belize Barrier Reef, is home to approximately 30% of the Mesoamerican Barrier Reef System. 

It begins near Isla Contoy on the northern tip of the Yucatán Peninsula and continues south alongside the Riviera Maya including areas like Cozumel and Banco Chinchorro. It then continues south along the eastern coast of Belize including many cayes and atolls. It extends to the north-east corner of Honduras.

Biodiversity

The reef system is home to more than 65 species of stony coral, 350 species of mollusk and more than 500 species of fish. There are numerous species that live in or around the reef system that are endangered or under some degree of protection, including the following: sea turtles (green sea turtle, loggerhead sea turtle, leatherback turtle, and the hawksbill turtle), the queen conch, the West Indian manatee, the splendid toadfish, the American crocodile, the Morelet's crocodile, the Nassau grouper, elkhorn coral, and black coral.

The reef system is suffering an invasion by the red lionfish (Pterois volitans and Pterois miles), which is native to the Indo-Pacific region. Lionfish severely damage the reef ecosystem by eating nearly every reef-tending species, such as cleaner shrimp and other species that eat algae. These animals keep the corals clean, alive, and disease-free. Lionfish eat up to 90% of the reef-tending species in a given area within just a few months, which can result in a quick death for a reef. Valuable commercial species, such as lobster, are being negatively affected by the spread of the lionfish due to their enormous appetite.

The reef system is home to one of the world's largest populations of manatees, with an estimated 1,000 to 1,500 of them.

Some northern areas of the reef system near Isla Contoy are home to the largest fish on the planet, the whale shark. The normally solitary whale sharks congregate there in social groups to eat and to mate.

Conservation
The Mesoamerican Barrier Reef System is considered critically endangered according to the criteria of the IUCN Red List of Ecosystems.

See also
 List of reefs
 Assisted evolution
 Coral Reef Alliance

References

External links

 Mesoamerican Barrier Reef System Project
 Mesoamerican Reef Alliance (MAR), a collaborative project for the management and conservation of the reef system, coordinated by the International Coral Reef Action Network (ICRAN)

 
Coral reefs
Marine ecoregions
Ecoregions of Central America
Natural history of Mesoamerica
Regions of Central America
Ecoregions of Belize
Ecoregions of El Salvador
Ecoregions of Guatemala
Ecoregions of Honduras
Ecoregions of Mexico
Protected areas of Belize
Protected areas of Mexico
Caribbean Sea articles missing geocoordinate data
IUCN Red List of Ecosystems